Belyta elegans is a species of diapriid wasps found in Europe.

References 

Insects described in 1909
Parasitica